"Cold Days, Hot Nights" is a song by the German synth-pop band Moti Special, released in 1984 as the first single from their debut studio album, Motivation (1985). The song was co-written by Manfred Theirs and Richard Palmer-James, and produced by Moti Special. The song reached No. 3 in West Germany and No. 4 in Switzerland.

Track listing 
 German 7-inch single
A. "Cold Days, Hot Nights" – 3:42
B. "Out of Tune (Instrumental)" – 3:18

 German 12-inch maxi single
A. "Cold Days, Hot Nights" – 5:00
B. "Out of Tune (Instrumental)" – 3:18

Charts

References

External links 
 

1984 songs
1984 singles
Moti Special songs
Teldec singles